Henry Ventura (Falcón, 23 May 1965 – Caracas, 1 May 2021) was a Venezuelan politician who served as health minister and as a deputy of the National Assembly from 2020 until his death.

References

1965 births
2021 deaths
Venezuelan politicians
Members of the National Assembly (Venezuela)
Deaths from the COVID-19 pandemic in Venezuela
Death in Caracas